WGEO may refer to:
WGEO (shortwave), an international shortwave station owned and operated by General Electric in Schenectady, New York from 1939 to  1963.
WGEO-LP, a low-power radio station licensed to Georgetown, South Carolina, United States.